Switak's banded gecko (Coleonyx switaki), also commonly known as the barefoot banded gecko, the barefoot gecko, and Switak's barefoot gecko, is a species of lizard in the family Eublepharidae. The species is indigenous to the extreme southwestern United States and adjacent northwestern Mexico.

Etymology
The specific name, switaki, is in honor of German herpetologist Karl-Heinz Switak (born 1938).

Geographic range
C. switaki is native to southern California in the United States and Baja California and Baja California Sur in Mexico.

Habitat
The preferred natural habitats of C. switaki are desert and rocky areas.

Taxonomy
Coleonyx gypsicolus, which is endemic to Isla San Marcos in Mexico, is sometimes considered a subspecies of C. switaki.

Description
The body of C. switaki is covered in round brown spots. Despite one of its common names, Switak's banded gecko, C. switaki has a variable color pattern that may not feature bands.

Reproduction
C. switaki is oviparous.

References

Further reading
Grismer LL (2001). "Geographic Variation of Color Pattern in Peninsular Populations of Coleonyx switaki (Squamata: Eublepharidae) from Baja California, Mexico and Southern California". Gekko 2 (1): 14–19.
Jones LLC, Lovich RE (2009). Lizards of the American Southwest: A Photographic Field Guide. Tucson, Arizona: Rio Nuevo Publishers. 568 pp.
Murphy RW (1974). "A new genus and species of eublepharine gecko (Sauria: Gekkonidae) from Baja California, Mexico". Proc. California Acad. Sci., Fourth Series 40: 87-92. (Anarbylus switaki, new species).
Rösler H (2000). "Kommentirte Liste der rezent, subrezent und fossil bekannten Geckotaxa (Reptilia: Gekkonomorpha)". Gekkota 2: 28–153. (Coleonyx switaki, p. 63). (in German).
Stebbins RC (2003). A Field Guide to Western Reptiles and Amphibians, Third Edition. The Peterson Field Guide Series ®. Boston and New York: Houghton Mifflin Company. 533 pp. . (Coleonyx switaki, pp. 265–266 + Plate 24 + Map 75).

Switak's banded gecko
Reptiles of Mexico
Reptiles of the United States
Fauna of the Southwestern United States
Reptiles described in 1974